Whig or Whigs may refer to:

Parties and factions

In the British Isles

 Whigs (British political party), one of two political parties in England, Great Britain, Ireland, and later the United Kingdom, from the 17th to 19th centuries
 Whiggism, the political philosophy of the British Whig party
 Radical Whigs, a faction of British Whigs associated with the American Revolution
 Patriot Whigs or Patriot Party, a Whig faction
 A nickname for the Liberal Party, the UK political party that succeeded the Whigs in the 1840s
 The Whig Party, a supposed revival of the historical Whig party, launched in 2014
 Whig government, a list of British Whig governments
 Whig history, the Whig philosophy of history
 A pejorative nickname for the Kirk Party, a radical Presbyterian faction of the Scottish Covenanters during the 17th-century Wars of the Three Kingdoms
 Whiggamore Raid, a march on Edinburgh by supporters of the Kirk faction in September 1648

In the United States
 A term used at the time of the American Revolution for patriots (supporters of the revolution against England)
 Whig Party (United States), a major political party which operated from 1834 to 1856

In Liberia
 True Whig Party, also known as the "Liberian Whig Party", Liberia's overwhelmingly dominant political party from 1878 to 1980

Music
The Whigs (band), a 2000s garage rock band
The Afghan Whigs, a 1990s indie rock band

Newspapers
 Cecil Whig of Cecil County, Maryland, United States
 The Kingston Whig-Standard of Kingston, Ontario, Canada, originally named the British Whig
 Brownlow's Whig, an East Tennessee, USA, newspaper published under various titles
 Quincy Herald-Whig of Quincy, Illinois, United States

Other uses
 American Whig-Cliosophic Society, also known as "Whig-Clio", a political, literary, and debating society at Princeton University
 White House Iraq Group, also known as the White House Information Group
 Confederate States Whig Party, a fictional political party created by alternate history author Harry Turtledove
 WHIG-CD, a low-power television station (channel 30, virtual 31) licensed to serve Rocky Mount, North Carolina, United States; see List of television stations in North Carolina

See also
 Wig (disambiguation)
 Tory